Harman Baweja  (born 13 November 1980) is an Indian actor and producer. He has starred in films like Love Story 2050 (2008), What's Your Raashee? (2009) and It's My Life (2020).

Early life
Baweja was born to a film director Harry Baweja and producer Pammi Baweja. He attended the Kishore Namit Kapoor Acting Institute in Bombay and then the University of California, Los Angeles. In 2009, Baweja changed his name to Harman S Baweja following numerology. The "S" in his name is a tribute to his grandfather.

Career
Baweja was credited as a producer for Hansal Mehta's Yeh Kya Ho Raha Hai?.

Baweja's debut film in Bollywood was the sci-fi romance Love Story 2050 produced by his mother Pammi Baweja and directed by his father Harry Baweja. The film was a box office failure, as it only managed to recover half the amount of its 40 crore budget.
In 2009, he appeared in the sports film Victory which was based on cricket. The film had notable appearances by both Indian and International cricketers. The film could only rake up 1.9 crore after its release and was a failure at the box office.

Baweja next appeared in the romantic comedy What's Your Raashee? which starred him and Priyanka Chopra, who performed 12 different roles in the film. The film receives mixed responses both from critics and audience .The film performed poor at the box office. After a 5 year long absence he came in Dishkiyaoon (2014). His delayed release, It's My Life, released directly on television 10 years after production, with a premiere on Zee Cinema.

Filmography

Films

Acting Credits

Television

Acting Credits

References

External links

 
 

1980 births
Living people
Indian male film actors
Male actors from Chandigarh
Male actors in Hindi cinema